"Bacc At It Again" is a song by American rapper Yella Beezy featuring fellow American rappers Quavo and Gucci Mane, released as a single on March 15, 2019. The music video was released on April 15, 2019. The song debuted at number 94 on the US Billboard Hot 100, becoming Yella Beezy's second song to chart on the Hot 100 after his 2018 song "That's On Me", which reached number 56.

Background
The song marks Yella Beezy's first official single after he was shot and hospitalized in October 2018.

Music video
The music video, directed by Benny Boom, was released on April 25, 2019. It features a "futuristic" theme and appearances from all three rappers.

Charts

Certifications

References

2019 singles
2019 songs
Yella Beezy songs
Quavo songs
Gucci Mane songs
Songs written by Gucci Mane
Songs written by Quavo
Songs written by Quay Global
Song recordings produced by Quay Global